Lyady is a rural locality (a selo) in Sylvenskoye Rural Settlement, Permsky District, Perm Krai, Russia. The population was 1,156 as of 2010. There are 63 streets.

Geography 
Lyady is located 32 km east of Perm (the district's administrative centre) by road. Malaya is the nearest rural locality.

References 

Rural localities in Permsky District